Sinar Mas Land is an Indonesian real estate development company, which is a subsidiary of Sinar Mas Group. It combines two big developers, Bumi Serpong Damai and Duta Pertiwi. It formed in 1988 under the flag of Duta Pertiwi. It now holds substantial interests in a businesses including residential housing, apartments, shopping centers, hotels, office buildings, industrial estates, townships and cities. Its head office building, designed by Aedas, is located in the BSD Green Office Park in Jakarta and received a high commendation under Indonesia’s office architecture at Asia Pacific Property Awards 2014.

Attached companies and investments 
Sinar Mas Land is the holding company for a number of subsidiaries.

City and township projects 
Sinar Mas Land city development consists of two major projects: City (BSD City and Kota Deltamas) and Township (Kota Wisata and Grand Wisata). Each city encompasses an area of more than 1,000 hectares.

Residential projects

Commercial and industrial projects

Retail and trade centre projects

Hotel, resort and golf course projects 

 Le Premier Kota Deltamas

References

External links
 

Sinar Mas Group
Companies based in Tangerang
Real estate companies established in 1988
Real estate companies of Indonesia